Surender Sharma (also written as Surendra Sharma) is an Indian poet, writer and humorist. He often writes and performs comic sketches of himself and his wife and known for his refrain chaar lainaa suna raha hoon in Haryanavi dialect.  He was honoured by the Government of India in 2013, with the award of Padma Shri for his contributions to the field of literature.

In October 2018, he was appointed as the Vice-Chairman of Hindi Academy, Government of Delhi, succeeded by Vishnu Khare. Previously, he held the position of vice-president of Haryana Sahitya Academy, which is run under Haryana government. He is also a member of the Central Board of Film Certification.

Early life and career 
Surender Sharma was born into a Brahmin family in Haryana. He hails from a village Nangal Choudhary of Mahendragarh district, Haryana. He holds a degree in Commerce from Shri Ram College of Commerce of Delhi University.

In an interview with Mid-Day, Sharma said, he started performing poetry in 1966 when he was in college, but, started doing it professionally since the 1970s. He uses Marwari and Haryanavi dialect for his humour.

In 1980, the T-Series released a cassette named Chaar Laina Kavi.

In 2004, he hosted his own daily radio show, Sharmaji Se Poocho, which used to air on Red FM 93.5. In the nineties, he edited three poetry collections under the title Ras Kalash. He serves as a trustee and vice president for the Bhagwan Parshuram Institute of Technology.

Published work  
 Mansarovar Ke Kauwe 
 Buddhimaanon Ki Moorkhtaaein  
 Bade-Badon Ke Utpaat 
 Mujhse Bhala Na Koy

Awards and recognition 
Apart from Padma Shri, He is also a recipient of Kaka Hathrasi Hasya Samman and Manhar Thahaka Award.

See also 

 List of Hindi-language poets
 List of Hindi-language authors

References

Further reading

External links 
 Surender Sharma's Interview with Daily Bhaskar (Hindi)
 पार्टी जीत जाती है, देश हार जाता है- हास्य कवि सुरेन्द्र शर्मा at Rajasthan Patrika

1945 births
Living people
Hindi-language writers
Hindi-language poets
People from Mahendragarh district
Indian humorists
Recipients of the Padma Shri in literature & education
20th-century Indian poets
Poets from Haryana
Indian male poets
20th-century Indian male writers
21st-century Indian male writers